Md. Azizur Rahman Miah is a Bangladesh Awami League politician and the former Member of Parliament of Naogaon-1.

Career
Miah was elected to parliament from Naogaon-1 as a Bangladesh Awami League candidate in 1991.

References

Awami League politicians
Living people
5th Jatiya Sangsad members
People from Naogaon District
Year of birth missing (living people)